Ang Li Peng (born 8 July 1981) is a former Malaysian badminton player. She was the women's doubles gold medalist at the 2002 Commonwelath Games in Manchester, England. At the IBF World Grand Prix event, she won the women's doubles title in 1999 Polish Open partnered with Chor Hooi Yee. She emerged as the National champion in 2002 in the women's doubles event with Lim Pek Siah.

Ang graduated with law degree at the University of Manchester in 2010.

Achievements

Commonwealth Games 
Women's doubles

Southeast Asian Games 
Women's doubles

Mixed doubles

IBF World Grand Prix 
The World Badminton Grand Prix sanctioned by International Badminton Federation (IBF) since 1983.

Women's doubles

IBF International

References

External links 
 

Living people
1981 births
People from Selangor
Malaysian sportspeople of Chinese descent
Malaysian female badminton players
Badminton players at the 2002 Asian Games
Asian Games competitors for Malaysia
Badminton players at the 2002 Commonwealth Games
Commonwealth Games gold medallists for Malaysia
Commonwealth Games medallists in badminton
Competitors at the 1997 Southeast Asian Games
Competitors at the 1999 Southeast Asian Games
Competitors at the 2001 Southeast Asian Games
Southeast Asian Games silver medalists for Malaysia
Southeast Asian Games bronze medalists for Malaysia
Southeast Asian Games medalists in badminton
Alumni of the University of Manchester
Medallists at the 2002 Commonwealth Games